Colobothea paulina is a species of beetle in the family Cerambycidae. It was described by Bates in 1865. It is known from Brazil, Peru, and French Guiana.

References

paulina
Beetles described in 1865